Ali Muhammad Naik was a member of the Indian parliament. Naik was one of the many NC lawmakers who ditched Farooq Abdullah and topped his government by allying with Ghulam Mohammad Shah. Shah made him the Revenue Minister. Post-1990, Naik and almost all others returned to National Conference, contested and were elected to the assembly. He served as speaker of the state assembly. He also served as Member of Parliament by defeating Mufti Mohammad Syed from Anantnag constituency. He was a member of the Jammu & Kashmir National Conference party. He survived a militant attack in 2006 near Tral bus stand. He died in 2017.

References

Year of birth missing
2017 deaths
Jammu & Kashmir National Conference politicians